Kim Kwang-sun (born June 8, 1964) is a retired South Korean boxer.

Amateur career
Kim won the gold medal in the Men's Flyweight (51 kg) category at the 1988 Summer Olympics in Seoul. He was a two-time Boxing World Cup champion as well.

Results

Pro career
Kim turned pro in 1990 and after only five fights took on Humberto González in 1992 for the WBC Light Flyweight title.  Although he was leading in the fight, he lost in a 12th-round TKO.  In 1993 he took on Michael Carbajal for the WBC and IBF Light Flyweight title but was TKO'd in the 7th round.  He retired after the bout with a record of 6-2-0. American television commentators said they thought Kim was winning the Carbajal bout.

References

External links
 

1964 births
Living people
Flyweight boxers
Boxers at the 1984 Summer Olympics
Boxers at the 1988 Summer Olympics
Olympic boxers of South Korea
Olympic gold medalists for South Korea
Olympic medalists in boxing
Asian Games medalists in boxing
Boxers at the 1986 Asian Games
South Korean male boxers
Medalists at the 1988 Summer Olympics
Asian Games gold medalists for South Korea
Medalists at the 1986 Asian Games
South Korean Buddhists
Sportspeople from North Jeolla Province